Habib Chaab (born 1973) is an Iranian-Swedish political activist, founder and former leader of Arab Struggle Movement for the Liberation of Ahvaz. In October 2020, having lived in exile in Sweden for 14 years, he visited Turkey where he was abducted and smuggled to Iran. Turkish security sources state that Iranian intelligence was behind Chaab's kidnapping.

See also
Arab Struggle Movement for the Liberation of Ahvaz
Ahvaz military parade attack

References

Living people
Iranian dissidents
People from Shushtar
1973 births